"Oh bah oui" is a song by Lacrim and Booba released in 2017. The song has peaked at number ten on the French Singles Chart.

Charts

Certifications

References

2017 singles
2017 songs
French-language songs